Nassarius idyllius is a species of sea snail, a marine gastropod mollusc in the family Nassariidae, the nassa mud snails (USA) or dog whelks (UK).

Description
The shell grows to a length of 5 mm

Distribution
This species is distributed in the Red Sea and in the Indo-West Pacific

References

 Vine, P. (1986). Red Sea Invertebrates. Immel Publishing, London. 224 pp
 Cernohorsky W.O. (1981). Revision of the Australian and New Zealand Tertiary and Recent species of the family Nassariidae (Mollusca: Gastropoda). Records of the Auckland Institute and Museum 18:137–192.
 Cernohorsky W. O. (1984). Systematics of the family Nassariidae (Mollusca: Gastropoda). Bulletin of the Auckland Institute and Museum 14: 1–356.

Nassariidae
Gastropods described in 1901